Abelard Piotr Giza (born 15 November 1980) is a comedian and screenwriter. He was a leader and founder of the Kabaret Limo, a cabaret group that existed between 1999 and 2014.

Comedian career 
He was a creator of Kabaret Limo, a cabaret group that existed from 1999 to 2014.

Private life 
Abelard Giza was born on 15 November 1980 in Gdańsk, Poland. He is an older brother of painter Hugon Giza (born 1982) and grandson of painter Hugon Lasecki. He graduated political science at University of Gdańsk. He is married to Daria Zarówna-Giza, who is a photographer, and with whom he has 2 dauthers, Mia and Ida.

Filmography

Movie production, scriptwriting and directing 
 Wożonko (2003)
 Towar (2005)
 Demo (2005)
 W stepie szerokim (2007)
 Swing (2013)

Voice acting 
 Kayko and Kokosh as Oferma (2021)

Theater and stand-up comedy

With Muflasz Group 
 Babie Doły (2001)
 Delektacja (2002)
 Atlantikon (2002)
 Truflasz, czyli polowanie na dzika (2006)
 Dżangyl (2007)

Stand-up comedy 
 Stand up. Zabij mnie śmiechem (2010)
 Proteus Vulgaris (2015)
 Jeszcze To (2015)
 Ludzie, trzymajcie kapelusze (2016)
 Numer 3 (2018)
 Piniata (2019)

Awards

Film awards 

 2005: Kolbudy Festival – Złoty Grombuś for Towar film
 2005: Oskariada (Warsaw) – 2nd award for Towar film
 2005: KAN Film Festival (Wrocław) – Kanewka Publiczności for Towar film
 2005: Sztorm Roku – Gazeta Wyborcza award in "film and multimedia" category
 2006: OFFskar – best script for Towar film
 2007: Barejada Film Festival (Jelenia Góra) – Best Independent Feature Film for W stepie szerokim
 2007: 32nd Gdynia Film Festival – distinction for W stepie szerokim

Other 
 City of Gdańsk Award for Young Culture Creators (2008)

References 

1980 births
Living people
University of Gdańsk alumni
Artists from Gdańsk
Polish cabaret performers
Polish film directors
Polish male voice actors
Polish screenwriters
Polish stand-up comedians
Polish theatre directors
20th-century Polish male actors
21st-century Polish male actors
Male actors from Gdańsk